Germán Blanco Álvarez (born November 6, 1965) is a Colombian politician, lawyer and professor. He is a Member of the Chamber of Representatives of Colombia representing Antioquia. Alvarez was President of the Chamber of Representatives of Colombia from 2020 to 2021.

Biography 
Blanco Álvarez was born on November 6, 1965. He grew up in the Boyacá Las Brisas neighborhood of Medellín. Alvarez attended the Universidad Autónoma Latinoamericana and studied law. He subsequently graduated with an LL.B in Law. He also attended the University of Medellín and studied Government and Public Relations. Alvarez has a Diploma in Democracy and Leadership from Israel.

German Alvarez started his career as an official at the Medellín judicial branch between 1988 and 1991. Subsequently, after serving the in the judiciary he was appointed Secretary of Government in Támesis between 1992 and 1993. In 2001, he was the Deputy in the Assembly of Antioquia till 2007. In 2010, he was elected into the Chamber of Representatives of Colombia. He was appointed the First Vice President of the Chamber in 2013. During his two terms in the House of Representatives, he has presented 29 Bills, of which 23 are Co-authored and 6 Authorship. He has cited 5 group discussions and 5 on a private initiative.

References 

Living people
People from Antioquia Department
Colombian politicians
1965 births
Members of the Chamber of Representatives of Colombia
20th-century Colombian lawyers
21st-century Colombian politicians
Universidad de Medellín alumni